Terence Keith "Terry" Twell (21 February 1947 – 27 February 2013) was an English professional footballer who played in the Football League for Birmingham City. He played as a goalkeeper.

Twell was born in Doncaster, which is now in South Yorkshire. He began his football career with Bourne Town, and turned professional with Birmingham City in October 1964. Manager Stan Cullis gave him his debut in place of Jim Herriot in the Second Division on 14 October 1967 at home to Portsmouth. He was beaten by a 30-yard lob in that game, which finished as a 2–2 draw, conceded four goals in the next, and that was the end of his career in the Football League. He moved into non-league football with Stamford the following year, and was on the books of Bromsgrove Rovers during the 1969–70 season.

Twell died on 27 February 2013, aged 66.

References

1947 births
2013 deaths
Footballers from Doncaster
English footballers
Association football goalkeepers
Bourne Town F.C. players
Birmingham City F.C. players
Stamford A.F.C. players
Bromsgrove Rovers F.C. players
English Football League players